Maria Cristina Ozzetti, known as Ná Ozzetti, (born 12 December 1958 ) is a Brazilian singer and composer. She has been associated with the Vanguarda Paulista movement, having been a vocalist for the band Rumo before following a solo career.

Biography 
In her childhood, Ná Ozzetti learned to play the piano. After her graduation as a visual artist, she began her musical career as a singer of the group RUMO in the late 1970s, with whom she recorded a total of seven records. In 1988 her first album, Ná Ozzetti, was released. At the end of the 1980s, she was a member of Itamar Assumpção's ensemble on various tours in Europe. Her second album Ná was arranged to a large extent by her brother Dante Ozzetti. In 1996 her CD Love Lee Rita  was released, a tribute to the Brazilian singer Rita Lee. With the pianist André Mehmari, she recorded Piano e Voz in 2005 in a duet. Her 2009 album, Balangandãs, includes compositions by Assis Valente, Ary Barroso and Dorival Caymmi. Ná Ozzetti received a number of awards in Brazil as a singer,

Discography 
 Ná Ozzetti, Warner Continental, 1988
 Ná, Ná Records, 1994
 Love Lee Rita (Canções de Rita Lee desde os Mutantes), Dabliu, 1996
 Estopim, Ná Records, 1999
 Show, Som Livre, 2001
 Piano e Voz (com André Mehmari), MCD, 2005
 DVD Piano e Voz (com André Mehmari), MCD, 2006
 Balangandãs, MCD, 2009
 Meu Quintal, Borandá, 2011
 Embalar, Circus Produções, 2013
 Ná e Zé, Circus Produções, 2015
 Thiago França, YB Produções, 2015

Awards 
 1989– Prêmio Sharp de Música Brasileira – Best New Female Singer
 2000-Festival de Música Brasileira- Best interpretation (song Show", by Luiz Tatit and Fábio Tagliaferri.)
 2005– Prêmio Bravo! Prime de música e cultura (Best Popular CD, with Balangandãs)

References

External links 
 Official site (in Portuguese)
 Ná Ozzetti on Enciclopédia Itaú Cultural (in Portuguese)
 Ná Ozzetti on Allmusic

1958 births
Living people
Brazilian women pianists
Música Popular Brasileira musicians
Singers from São Paulo
20th-century pianists
21st-century pianists
20th-century Brazilian women singers
20th-century Brazilian singers
21st-century Brazilian women singers
21st-century Brazilian singers
20th-century women pianists
21st-century women pianists